The Untersee (German for Lower Lake), also known as Lower Lake Constance, is the smaller of the two lakes that together form Lake Constance and forms part of the boundary between Switzerland and Germany.

Geography 

The Lower Lake Constance measures  and is situated about  lower than the Obersee. The Romans called it Lacus Acronius. In the Middle Ages, the Upper Lake was called Bodamicus Lacus, or Bodensee in German. At some point in time, this term began to include the Lower Lake, and a new term "Upper Lake" (in German: Obersee), was introduced for the larger lake.

The main tributaries are the Seerhein and Radolfzeller Aach. The landscape surrounding the Untersee is very diverse. The Untersee contains two islands: Reichenau and Werd (near the transition to the High Rhine). In the northeast is found the peninsula Bodanrück; in the northwest, the Hegau lowlands with the peninsula Mettnau; in the west, the peninsula Höri, with a mountain called Schiener Berg, and in the south, the Seerücken, which reaches more than 300 feet above the Untersee near Berlingen.

Bordering the Lower Lake Constance are the Swiss cantons of Thurgau and Schaffhausen and the German state of Baden-Württemberg. In contrast to the Upper Lake, the border between Germany and Switzerland across the Lower Lake is well defined. Municipalities on the Swiss side are Gottlieben, Ermatingen, Salenstein, Berlingen, Steckborn, Mammern, Eschenz and Stein am Rhein. Municipalities on the German side are Öhningen, Gaienhofen, Moos am Bodensee, Radolfzell, Reichenau, Allensbach and Constance.

Zeller See, Gnadensee and Markelfingen Winkel 

Three parts in the north of Lower Lake have names of their own: Zeller See (lit.: "Lake of Radolfzell"), Gnadensee (lit.: "Lake Mercy") and Markelfingen Winkel (lit.: the nook of Markelfingen). The Zeller See is the part between the peninsula Mettnau in the north, of the peninsula Höri in the south and Island of Reichenau in the east. To the west lies the estuary of the Radolfzeller Aach. The Gnadensee extends Allensbach in the north and the Island of Reichenau in the south, from the tip of Mettnau in the west to the Reichenau causeway with its highly visible poplar avenue in the east.

According to legend, the name Gnade of the lake comes from the time when the court house was located on the Island of Reichenau. If a defendant was sentenced to death, the execution of the sentence could not be carried out on the island, but only on the mainland because the island was "holy ground". Therefore, the condemned man was brought by boat to the mainland in the direction of Allensbach, where the sentence could be Gnade. Now, if the abbot wanted to pardon the condemned, he would ring a bell before the offender arrived on the other shore. This signaled to the executioner on the mainland, that prisoner had been pardoned.

The story above is unlikely to be true. A more probable theory is that the lake is named after Maria, "Our Lady of Mercy", as the church of the abbey on the island was dedicated to St. Mary and St. Mark. The town name Frauenfeld in neighbouring canton of Thurgau can be similarly explained.

The Markelfingen Winkel is the western end of the Gnadensee, between Markelfingen in the north, Radolfzell in the west and Mettnau in the south. Its eastern boundary is at the level of the summit Mettnauspitze. With is maximum water depth of 16 m, the Markelfingen Winkel is the shallowest part of the lake. It has a tributary: the Mühlbach, which drains the Mindelsee.

Rheinsee 
The mainly Swiss section of the lake below of the Island of Reichenau and its southwestern arm is known as Rheinsee (lit.: "Rhine Lake", not to be confused with Seerhein (lit.: "Lake Rhine"), which is the Upper and Lower Lakes connecting segment of the river Rhine). This section of the lake follows more or less the border between Germany and Switzerland and is also called "Rhine Lake", since the current of the Rhine follows exactly this path to the effluent of the Lake Constance in the Swiss town of Stein am Rhein, where the High Rhine starts.

See also 

Obersee (Lake Constance)

References

Bibliography 
 Patrick Brauns, Wolfgang Pfrommer: Nature Hiking Guide Untersee. Nature guide to the unique cultural landscapes in the western Lake Constance area. (Hiking, biking, inline skating, canoeing, boat tours), Naturerbe-Verlag Resch, Überlingen, 1999, .

Geography of Lake Constance
Lakes of Baden-Württemberg
Lakes of the canton of Schaffhausen
Lakes of Thurgau